Baltes is a German language surname. It stems from the male given name Balthasar – and may refer to:
Adalbert Baltes (1916–1992), German inventor
Benjamin Baltes (1984), German former professional footballer
Hansjörg Baltes (1964), German speed skater
Heiner Baltes (1949), German retired footballer
Paul Baltes (1939–2006), German psychologist
Peter Baltes (1958), German hard rock and heavy metal musician
Peter Joseph Baltes (1827–1886), German-born American prelate
Werner Balte (1948–2007), German football midfielder

References 

German-language surnames
Surnames from given names